The 2021 World Grand Prix (also known as the 2021 Cazoo World Grand Prix) was a professional snooker tournament that took place from 13 to 19 December 2021 at the Coventry Building Society Arena in Coventry, England. The event was the first of three events to make up the Cazoo Cup in the 2021–22 snooker season.

The defending champion was Judd Trump, who overcame Jack Lisowski 10–7 in the previous year's final. However, he lost 3–4 in the round of 16 to Tom Ford.

Ronnie O'Sullivan won the tournament for a second time, defeating Neil Robertson 10–8 in the final.

Prize fund
The breakdown of prize money for the event is shown below:

 Winner: £100,000
 Runner-up: £40,000
 Semi-final: £20,000
 Quarter-final: £12,500
 Last 16: £7,500
 Last 32: £5,000
 Highest break: £10,000
 Total: £380,000

Seeding list
The top 32 players on the one-year ranking list, up to and including the 2021 Scottish Open, qualified for the tournament. Seedings were based on the order of the player in that list.

Tournament draw

Final

Century breaks
A total of 23 century breaks were made by 15 players during the tournament.

 139  Stephen Maguire
 133, 130  Tom Ford
 128, 117, 108, 100  Neil Robertson
 128  Jack Lisowski
 124, 105  Stuart Bingham
 119  Hossein Vafaei
 117  Mark Williams
 114  Mark Allen
 114  Kyren Wilson
 112, 107  Ronnie O'Sullivan
 112, 104  Mark Selby
 111  Yan Bingtao
 106  Jimmy Robertson
 105, 100  Luca Brecel
 101  Zhao Xintong

References

World Grand Prix
Sport in Coventry
Snooker competitions in England
Players Series
December 2021 sports events in the United Kingdom
World Grand Prix